Miss Mongolia is the beauty contest held in Mongolia to select Mongolia's representatives for Miss International. The first Miss Mongolia competition took place in 2001. Miss Mongolia pageant's official organizer is Desoft Media company. This pageant is unrelated to Miss World Mongolia.

History
The Miss Mongolia Association is the oldest national competition in Mongolia. Its purposes are to promote Mongolian beauty and values, Mongolian young people, particularly young girls with education, communication, and to conduct activities aimed at improving the knowledge of beauty. The Association runs as a non-profit non-governmental organization. The committee has also arranged for the winners to compete at the Miss International and Miss Earth.

Miss Mongolia 2014 is Yu Baljidmaa. She withdrew from Miss International 2014 and was replaced by her runner-up, Altangerel Bayartsetseg.

Designations
On October 5, 2014 Altangerel Bayartsetseg was appointed as "Miss International Mongolia". The 2014 winner, Yu Baljidmaa did not compete in unknown reasons. Bayartsetseg is the second princess of 2014.

Titleholders

Miss Mongolia

Big Four pageants representatives
The following women have represented Mongolia in the Big Four international beauty pageants, the four major international beauty pageants for women. These are Miss World, Miss Universe, Miss International and Miss Earth.

Miss International Mongolia

Miss Mongolia has started to send a Miss Mongolia to Miss International from 2001. The winner represents Mongolia at Miss International. On occasion, when the winner does not qualify (due to age) for either contest, a runner-up is sent.

See also 

 Miss World Mongolia

References

External links
 Miss Mongolia website
 Official page

 

Beauty pageants in Mongolia
Mongolian awards